Heliocarya is a monotypic genus of flowering plants belonging to the family Boraginaceae. The only species is Heliocarya monandra.

Its native range is Iran.

References

Boraginoideae
Boraginaceae genera
Monotypic asterid genera
Taxa named by Alexander von Bunge